Laura Tevary Mam (born 31 October 1986) is a Cambodian-American artist, songwriter, music producer, and businesswoman. She is known for being a member of the Cambodian Original Music Movement and is the founder and CEO of Baramey Productions. Mam is Cambodia's first independent popstar to gain nationwide recognition for original music and wins major brand ambassadorships. Mam’s success inspired her to co-found Baramey Production, an artist management and music production company with a shared resource model and a vision to make original music mainstream in Cambodia.

Early life

Laura Tevary Mam was born in San Jose, California to a Cambodian immigrant and Buddhist family. Her mother Thida Buth was a software developer in Silicon Valley, born and raised in Phnom Penh, Cambodia. She left her career to become an author and published her first book, បាត់ស្រមោល, in 2020. Buth also helped produce, starred in, and edited 5 books and 4 documentary films about the Cambodian Genocide. Mam had a very close relationship with her Grandmother, Bun Ean, who believed that she was her husband, Buth Cheon, who reincarnated with her mother. Buth Choen was killed by the Khmer Rouge because of his position as a politician, intellectual, and congressman. Laura Mam’s father Vitou Mam is a Lead Mechanic at United Airlines, born and raised in Phnom Penh, Cambodia. Both of Mam’s parents are Khmer Rouge Genocide survivors. They fled war-torn Cambodia to Thailand when Vietnam invaded Cambodia in January 1979. They were accepted as political refugees in the United States of America in March 1980. The two met while they were living under the Khmer Rouge Rule and were arranged to be married by their respective family.

Mam has a young brother, Andrew Tevuth Mam, and a younger half-sister, Tiffany Mam, on her father’s side.

Education

Mam grew up in San Jose California with a diverse community of Asian Americans. Mam’s mother introduced her to the Cambodian community where they taught her The Cambodian language (Khmer) and the Cambodian performing arts at age 8, which she came to love. While attending the University of California at Berkeley, she took courses in Khmer language and culture. Mam graduated in 2008 with a Bachelor of Arts with a major in Anthropology.

Career

Laura was born in the United States to Cambodian refugee parents and attended University of California, Berkeley.  Her mother, Thida Buth, had been raised to be free and expressive as a child and sing publicly. Laura's parents wanted her and her brother to feel fully American, and raised them speaking English. However, Laura's mother sang her Khmer lullabies, and gave her Cambodian dancing lessons, so she would have an appreciation of the culture of Cambodia.

Laura Mam had no intention of becoming a pop star. At the time that Laura’s surprise career was born, she was completing a degree in anthropology with a social-cultural focus on Cambodia, and working at Global Heritage Fund on the preservation of a Cambodian heritage site. Mam stumbled into the entertainment world after one of her original Khmer-language songs, ផ្កាព្រហាមរីកពព្រាយ, went viral on YouTube. The video had reached 75,000 views in the course of a single night. But it wasn't just about the numbers. The viewers' reactions, the majority of them from the Cambodian diaspora around the world, stunned them. This reaction is due to the destruction of Cambodian art by the Khmer Rouge. In the late 1960s and ‘70s, Phnom Penh was a flourishing musical hotbed, with King Norodom Sihanouk a musician and fervent patron of the arts as documented in a film, Don't Think I've Forgotten: Cambodia's Lost Rock And Roll. After the fall of the Khmer Rouge in 1979, the once-thriving Cambodian music scene was too decimated to recover. Virtually all of the musicians who survived the purges fled the country and were exiled. Laura and new original artists like her were finding ways around the industry's barriers. These artists used social media platforms such as Facebook and Youtube to circumvent the karaoke production houses and bring the songs they were writing straight to fans. Moving to Cambodia opened Laura's eyes to what was happening behind the scenes in the country's music industry.

In 2016, Laura and her mother founded Baramey Production, their own production company dedicated to boosting original talent. The first group they signed was Kmeng Khmer, which means Khmer youth.

Throughout the years, Mam has produced concerts, performed opening acts, and shared the stage with top-tiered international musicians such as Jessie J, Demi Lovato, and Charlie Puth.

Now as a solo artist and CEO of Baramey Production, Laura is finding her unique musical voice that is a mix of indie with Khmer traditional sounds while expanding the company to elevate the music industry in Cambodia to the international level.  Mam is well known for her incorporation of Khmer traditional music into modern sounds as evidenced in her songs “Fate”, and “Just Like You”, and her “Buong Suong” performance at the ASEAN Music Showcase Festival (AMS) with the multi-talented singer, songwriter, record producer, and instrumentalist Vanthan. 

In 2018, Laura won an art and Culture prize from the Women of the Future Awards South East Asia.

Baramey Pte.Ltd

In 2016, Laura and her mother created Baramey, their own production company dedicated to supporting upcoming artists and boosting original talent and the original music movement. Baramey's music ranges from hip-hop and rock to psychedelic, to traditional Khmer with a modern twist. First signing in Kmeng Khmer, Baramey's music revolution now boasts 15 artists and 20 albums, including the current Cambodian hip-hop sensation, VannDa, and other artists such as Sophia Kao, Vanthan, Lux, Polarix, and La Cima Cartel.

Kmeng Khmer, the pioneering pop/hip hop duo and the first group to sign to Baramey was discovered by Laura Mam in 2014 while they were, at the time, solo artists, working on a joint project with the group Smallworld, Smallband. Mam saw their unique sounds and potential in propelling the original music movement. Kmeng Khmer hit instant success with their nationwide smash hit “Bonn Phum” (a collaboration with Smallworld Smallband), and their debut album was released eight months after signing with Baramey Production, “My Way”.  In 2018, Kmeng Khmer released “My Way 2” including the hit songs “Far Away” and “Na Na Ke”. Kmeng Khmer has headlined large local concerts, consistently delivering a high-energy dance performance balanced with a selection of more emotional songs that strike a chord with Khmer youth. Their playfulness on- and off-stage makes them easily approachable by fans, allowing them to engage with their audience in a way that is unseen before in Cambodia. They are high energy and fun, but also keep it real.  Kmeng Khmer are maturing alongside their fans. Kmeng Khmer has represented popular brands including Smart, Adidas, iflix, Grab, Sting energy drink, Tiger Beer’s “Uncage the Night”, The Place gym, and Gingko milk drink.
 
In 2021, VannDa and Baramey Production blew up domestically and internationally with the release of “Time to Rise” featuring Master Kong Nay. The chart-topping hit exploded throughout Southeast Asia with its blend of soul-piercing lyricism and Khmer instrumentation with Hip Hop & Drill sounds. The transcendent song featuring 77-year-old Cambodian music legend Master Kong Nay won Lifted Asia’s Song of the Year, and Music Video of the Year. It was placed in Apple Music’s Editorial Teams’ Top 100 songs of the year. The “Time to Rise” Music video now has garnered over 98 million views on Youtube. VannDa makes history again in 2022 with his collaboration on “Run The Town'' with the well-known Thai rapper F.Hero featuring 1 Mill and Sprite. The song, with its massive sound and multiple layers of production infusing traditional Khmer and Thai elements, has been heralded as a seminal track in Southeast Asian hip-hop history and an important step of collaboration between Cambodia and Thailand. A beacon of the power of hip hop to unite separate identities, the track “Run the Town” trended as high as the “54th Top Global Music Video” on Youtube. VannDa continues his international collaborations on hits such as "Young Man" featuring OG Bobby and collaborated with OG Bobby on the popular track "Bong". In November of the same day, VannDa makes history again with his performance at Thailand's biggest music festival Big Mountain Music Festival in Pak Chong District alongside some of the biggest names in Thai music including Phum Viphurit, Billkin, F.HERO, Three Man Down, H3F, Taitosmith and more.
 
In 2021, Baramey became the first Cambodian label to sign with ADA, the Asian division of Warner Music's label.With this partnership, Warner Music Group recognizes how Baramey created a platform for artists to release their songs in a domestic market that had been dominated by music piracy, helped shape local practices, establishes new benchmarks, and introduces a level of professionalism to the nascent Cambodian music sector. ADA Asia now works closely together with Baramey to increase opportunities for Cambodian artists through customized services – such as global music distribution, digital marketing, and sync licensing – while expanding the global reach of Khmer music and culture around the world.

Advocacy

Mam is a fervent advocate for Intellectual Property (IP) rights and IP law enforcement. When Mam first moved to Cambodia, she was faced with the norms of music piracy. Thus, inspiring her continuous fight for the original music movement in Cambodia. Mam believes that with the emergence of technology in Cambodia and how much content is created in the digital sphere, the rights and enforcement of IP should also revolve around technology in order to protect artists' content, the entertainment industry, and other sectors.

In 2018, Laura Mam hosted a TED Talk on How music revolution changes Cambodia narrative  where she captured audiences early on with her remakes of Khmer hits and her dramatic use of Khmer sounds and styles merged into Western styles of music. Mam discussed how her music has explored various forms of Cambodian music and her unique guitar skills and heavy dance performances in Cambodia. Mam’s brand extends to her larger vision as the CEO leading a new brand of premium original artists that is Baramey Production.

Awards and Nominations

Cambodian-American singer and songwriter Laura Mam has been awarded this year’s Arts and Culture prize from the Women of the Future Awards South East Asia.

Brand Ambassadorships

Discography

References

External links

Baramey Productions website

1986 births
Living people
21st-century Cambodian women singers
Female music video directors